Pseudostixis flavomarmorata is a species of beetle in the family Cerambycidae. It was described by Stephan von Breuning in 1964, originally as Pseudostixis flavomarmoratus. It is known from the Democratic Republic of the Congo.

References

Phrissomini
Beetles described in 1964
Endemic fauna of the Democratic Republic of the Congo